β2 microglobulin (B2M) is a component of MHC class I molecules. MHC class I molecules have α1, α2, and α3 proteins which are present on all nucleated cells (excluding red blood cells).  In humans, the β2 microglobulin protein is encoded by the B2M gene.

Structure and function

β2 microglobulin lies beside the α3 chain on the cell surface. Unlike α3, β2 has no transmembrane region. Directly above β2 (that is, further away from the cell) lies the α1 chain, which itself is next to the α2.

β2 microglobulin associates not only with the alpha chain of MHC class I molecules, but also with class I-like molecules such as CD1 (5 genes in humans), MR1, the neonatal Fc receptor (FcRn), and Qa-1 (a form of alloantigen). Nevertheless, the β2 microglobulin gene is outside of the MHC (HLA) locus, on a different chromosome.

An additional function is association with the HFE protein, together regulating the expression of hepcidin in the liver which targets the iron transporter ferroportin on the basolateral membrane of enterocytes and cell membrane of macrophages for degradation resulting in decreased iron uptake from food and decreased iron release from recycled red blood cells in the MPS (mononuclear phagocyte system) respectively. Loss of this function causes iron excess and hemochromatosis.

In a cytomegalovirus infection, a viral protein binds to β2 microglobulin, preventing assembly of MHC class I molecules and their transport to the plasma membrane.

Mice models deficient for the β2 microglobulin gene have been engineered. These mice demonstrate that β2 microglobulin is necessary for cell surface expression of MHC class I and stability of the peptide-binding groove. In fact, in the absence of β2 microglobulin, very limited amounts of MHC class I (classical and non-classical) molecules can be detected on the surface (bare lymphocyte syndrome or BLS). In the absence of MHC class I, CD8+ T cells cannot develop. (CD8+ T cells are a subset of T cells involved in the development of acquired immunity.)

Clinical significance
In patients on long-term hemodialysis, it can aggregate into amyloid fibers that deposit in joint spaces, a disease, known as dialysis-related amyloidosis.

Low levels of β2 microglobulin can indicate non-progression of HIV.

Levels of  β2 microglobulin can be elevated in multiple myeloma and lymphoma, though in these cases primary amyloidosis (amyloid light chain) and secondary amyloidosis (amyloid associated protein) are more common. The normal value of  β2 microglobulin is < 2 mg/L. However, with respect to multiple myeloma, the levels of β2 microglobulin may also be at the other end of the spectrum.  Diagnostic testing for multiple myeloma includes obtaining the  β2 microglobulin level, for this level is an important prognostic indicator.  , a patient with a level < 4 mg/L is expected to have a median survival of 43 months, while one with a level > 4 mg/L has a median survival of only 12 months.  β2 microglobulin levels cannot, however, distinguish between monoclonal gammopathy of undetermined significance (MGUS), which has a better prognosis, and smouldering (low grade) myeloma.

Loss-of-function mutations in this gene have been reported in cancer patients unresponsive to immunotherapies.

References

Further reading

External links 
 
 
 

Proteins
Immune system